Li Wuwei (November, 1942 – ) is a Chinese male politician and economist, who served as the vice chairperson of the Chinese People's Political Consultative Conference.

References 

1942 births
Vice Chairpersons of the National Committee of the Chinese People's Political Consultative Conference
Living people